Carlos Maldonado may refer to:

 Carlos Maldonado (catcher) (born 1979), Venezuelan baseball catcher in the Washington Nationals organization
 Carlos Maldonado (footballer) (born 1963), Venezuelan football (soccer) player
 Carlos Maldonado (pitcher) (born 1966), Panamanian baseball pitcher
 Carlos Maldonado Curti (born 1963), Chilean politician